Athgarvan is a Gaelic Athletic Association (GAA) club in Athgarvan, County Kildare, Republic of Ireland, which played a significant role in the development of the GAA in the 1890s.

Gaelic football
Athgarvan competed in the first junior C final in 1975, winning the competition in 1977.
Kildare county player David Butler. Youngest ever senior debut for the club was made by starlet prospect Rory (Rozza) O’Donnell at the age of 16 in 2019. Asked about the honour, a delighted Rory said : "It's a real privilege to play for this great club. Hopefully it will be the first of many appearances with the Seniors and I can go on to emulate Club legend Gary "The Mighty" Quinn in having a long and distinguished career."
Unfortunately, this was to be Rory’s final contribution to the Athgarvan Seniors, as he was soon dropped due to his extreme lack of footballing ability.

Hurling
Eyrefield competed in the hurling championships in the 1910s.

Ladies football
Athgarvan went to the All Ireland junior club final in 2005, losing to Mourneabbey of Cork by 2-11 to 2-7.

Honours
 Kildare Senior Football Championship Semi-finalists 1895
 Kildare Junior Football Championship: Winners (2) 1927, 1956
 Kildare Junior Football League (1) 1961
 Kildare Junior C Football Championship: (3) 1976, 1989, 2009
 Kildare Under-14 Football Division 5: Finalists 2014
 Kildare Under-15 Football Division 5: Finalists 2015
 Kildare Under-13 Football Division 4: Winners 2016
 Kildare Under-16 Football Division 4: Winners 2016
 Kildare Under-16 Football Division 4: Winners 2017
 Kildare Under-17 Football Division 4: Winners 2017

Bibliography
 Kildare GAA: A Centenary History, by Eoghan Corry, CLG Chill Dara, 1984,  hb  pb
 Kildare GAA yearbook, 1972, 1974, 1978, 1979, 1980 and 2000- in sequence especially the Millennium yearbook of 2000
 Soaring Sliothars: Centenary of Kildare Camogie 1904-2004 by Joan O'Flynn Kildare County Camogie Board.

External links
Athgarvan GAA site
Facebook page
Kildare GAA site
Kildare GAA club sites
Kildare on Hoganstand.com

Gaelic games clubs in County Kildare
Gaelic football clubs in County Kildare